

Events
January 21 – , the final royal masque of the Caroline era, is performed at Whitehall Palace. The work features music by composer Lewis Richard.

Publications

Music
Agostino Agazzari –  (Rome: Vincenzo Blanco)
Angelo Michele Bartolotti – , published in Florence
Giovanni Girolamo Kapsberger –  (Rome)

Theory
Pietro Della Valle –  (About the Music of our Time, which is not Worse but Better than that of Previous Ages)

Classical music
Claudio Monteverdi – , published in Venice

Opera
Francesco Cavalli – 
Benedetto Ferrari – , premiered in Venice
Claudio Monteverdi –

Births
January 5 – Paolo Lorenzani, composer (died 1713)
April 4 – Gaspar Sanz, Spanish priest and composer (d. 1710)
August 8 – Amalia Catharina, German poet and composer (d. 1697)
November 4 – Carlo Mannelli, Italian violinist, castrato singer and composer (d. 1697)
probable – Antonia Bembo, singer and composer (d. c. 1720)

Deaths
February 12 – Michael Altenburg, composer and theologian (born 1584)
April 10 – Agostino Agazzari, Sienese composer and music theorist (born 1578)
June – Peter Hasse, German organist and composer (b. c. 1585)
June 29 – John Adson, musician and composer (born c. 1587)
November – Giles Farnaby, virginalist and composer (born 1563)
Adriana Basile, Italian composer (b. 1580)
Francisca Duarte, Portuguese singer (b. 1595)